in Newcastle, New South Wales, in Australia. 

No1 Dairy Farmers Towers 34 and 27 story -102m,83m (proposed)

No2 Doma groups Twin 31 story towers -90m ( under construction ) 

No3 Yogurtland Twin 22 story towers -76m ( approved construction ) 

No4 Sky residences 19 story towers - 66m ( completed 2021 )

No5 Verve residence Twin 19 story towers - 66m ( completed 2019 )

No6 Icon tower 18 story - 57m ( completed 2017 )

No7 aero tower 16 story - 52m ( completed 2018 )

Hope someone out there can edit this to be presented better.).

References

https://www.newcastleherald.com.au/story/6938594/court-approves-newcastles-tallest-building/

Apartment buildings in Australia
History of Newcastle, New South Wales
Buildings and structures in Newcastle, New South Wales